After the monetary reform in Czechoslovakia, 1953 a new series of coins were introduced. Coins were first issued in denominations of 1, 3, 5, 10, 25 h – the 1, 3 and 5 Kčs denominations only existed as paper money (state notes). The heller/haléř/halier coins dated 1953 were all minted in Leningrad. The atypical denominations of 3 and 25 were directly copied from the Soviet roubles and kopecks. The 1, 3 and 5 Kčs state notes were replaced by coins in 1957, 1965 and 1966, respectively. The 50 h coin appeared in 1963. By the end of 1972 the 25 h and 3 Kčs coins were withdrawn, and 20 h (as part of the new series) and 2 Kčs coins were introduced instead in October. The 3 h coin was withdrawn in 1976. A redesigned series of 5, 10 and 20 heller coins (without 1 h, which had almost gone out of practical use by then) was released in 1977, 1974 and 1978, respectively. 3 and 5 crown coins were introduced in 1965 and 1966, respectively, with 20h and 2 koruny coins added in 1972. 10 korun coins were introduced in 1990.

Until 1960 the "REPUBLIKA ČESKOSLOVENSKÁ" inscription was used with the traditional pre-war coat of arms on the coins. After the 1960 Constitution of Czechoslovakia changed the country's full name, the strikes from 1961 onwards bore the new socialist-style coat of arms along with the inscription "ČESKOSLOVENSKÁ SOCIALISTICKÁ REPUBLIKA" (meaning "Czechoslovak Socialist Republic" in both Czech and Slovak).

Czechoslovakia